is a 2012 anime based on the manga by Keitaro Takahashi. The anime is produced by White Fox studios and directed by Keitaro Motonaga, produced by Gaku Iwasa, script by Yousuke Kuroda and music by Taku Iwasaki under the Jormungand Production Partners team. The series centers on Koko Hekmatyar, the only daughter of business tycoon Floyd Hekmatyar and the head of HCLI's Europe/African Weapons Transport Division. At the start of the series, she recruits Jonathan "Jonah" Mar, an experienced child soldier who had once fought in West Asia, as one of her bodyguards. The show then follows Koko's encounters and dealings with governments, private clients, rival arms dealers, and any and all sorts of the trouble she gets into in the course of her line of work as she sells weapons – from small arms, to military vehicles, to fighter aircraft upgrade kits. Because of the hazards involved, Koko relies on Jonah and her other bodyguards to ensure her safety.

The anime began airing on April 10, 2012, on Tokyo MX, Television Kanagawa, TV Aichi and KBS and on later dates on Sun TV, BS11 and AT-X. The show will also be seen online in Showtime, NicoNico, Bandai Channel and GyaO. A second season of the series, Jormungand: Perfect Order, was also announced and slated to be released in October 2012, which began broadcasting on Japanese TV on October 9, 2012. The two seasons aired on Japanese TV at 12:30 AM.

Funimation has licensed the series for the North American market with the French market under the license of Dybex. A sneak preview of the anime was held on March 31 to April 1, 2012, at the Anime Contents Expo at the Makuhari Messe in Chiba.

The first release of Jormungand on DVD and Blu-ray was officially released by Geneon Universal in Japan on June 27, 2012, with the first two episodes, "Gun Metal, Calico Road" and "Pulsar" included. Subsequent releases followed with two episodes each on both Blu-rays and DVDs on July 25, August 29 and September 26 of 2012. The Perfect Order DVD/Blu-rays was first released in Japan on December 21, 2012.

Both the opening and ending theme songs for the first season were produced by I've Sound. The opening song is "Borderland" by Mami Kawada, and the ending theme is "Ambivalentidea" by Nagi Yanagi. Both songs will be released as singles by the record label Geneon Universal Entertainment.

For the second season, the opening is "UNDER/SHAFT" by Maon Kurosaki, while the ending is "Laterality" by Nagi Yanagi. On the seven episode of the second season, "UNDER/SHAFT" was used at the ending song.

Episode list

Jormungand

Jormungand: Perfect Order

References
General
 Official Jormungand Story Page 

Specific

Notes

Jormungand (manga)